Walter Hahn (born 20 August 1987) is an Austrian professional wrestler. He is currently signed to WWE, where he performs on the SmackDown brand under the ring name Gunther and is the current WWE Intercontinental Champion in his first reign. He is the leader of Imperium.

Hahn has appeared in a number of independent promotions around the world, predominantly wrestling mononymously as Walter (stylized in all capital letters), most notably Westside Xtreme Wrestling (wXw), becoming a three-time wXw Unified World Wrestling Champion, Pro Wrestling Guerrilla (PWG), where he is a former one-time PWG World Champion, and Progress Wrestling, where he is a former Progress Unified World Champion. Overall, Walter is a five-time world champion in wrestling and the first Austrian to compete in WWE. After signing with WWE in early 2019, he debuted on the NXT UK brand and became a one-time NXT United Kingdom Champion; his 870-day reign is the longest for the now-defunct title. He moved over to the primary NXT brand in January 2022, where his ring name was changed to Gunther, before being promoted to the main roster on SmackDown in April that year.

Professional wrestling career

Westside Xtreme Wrestling (2007–2020)
Walter made his Westside Xtreme Wrestling (wXw) debut on 4 May 2007, in a match that also involved Atsushi Aoki, Adam Polak, and Tengkwa on the pre-show at the 16 Carat Gold Tournament. 

He defeated Zack Sabre Jr. to win the wXw Unified World Wrestling Championship on 2 October 2010 in Oberhausen, Germany. He lost the title to Daisuke Sekimoto on 15 January 2011, but won it back later that year on 2 May 2011, during a Big Japan Pro Wrestling card in Tokyo, Japan. He would then hold the title for 383 days, before losing it to El Generico on 19 May 2012. 

In early May 2012, Walter was defeated by Yoshihito Sasaki in a match to crown the inaugural BJW World Strong Heavyweight champion in Yokohama, Japan. He won the title for a third time on 27 July 2014, defeating Tommy End at Fans Appreciation Night, then lost it to Karsten Beck on 17 January 2015.

Walter and partner Robert Dreissker defeated RockSkillet (Jay Skillet and Jonathan Gresham) to win the wXw World Tag Team Championship at day three of 16 Carat Gold on 3 March 2013. They would later lose the titles in Hamburg, Germany to Hot and Spicy (Axel Dieter Jr. and Da Mack). He partnered with Zack Sabre Jr. to win the vacant wXw World Tag Team Championship on 4 October 2015 in the finals of the 2015 World Tag Team Tournament, but relinquished the title at the wXw Fifteenth Anniversary Show on 12 December 2015, losing to Cerebrus (Ilja Dragunov and Robert Dreissker). Walter and Ringkampf stablemate Timothy Thatcher defeated Massive Product (David Starr and Jurn Simmons) to win the wXw World Tag Team Championship in the finals of the 2017 wXw World Tag Team League on 8 October 2017. On 11 March Walter and Thatcher lost the wXw Tag Titles to Da Mack and John Klinger.

He was head trainer at the wXw Wrestling Academy until early 2020.

Progress Wrestling (2015–2019)
On 24 May 2015, Walter debuted as Big Daddy Walter in Progress Wrestling at the 2015 Super Strong Style 16 Tournament at the Electric Ballroom in London, losing to Rampage Brown in the first round. The two met again later in 2015 at Chapter 23: What A Time To Be Alive! in a match notable for the ring breaking after Brown was whipped into the corner. He entered the Super Strong Style 16 Tournament again in 2016, reaching the quarter-finals before being eliminated by Chris Hero.

Walter participated in the tournament to determine the inaugural Progress Atlas champion in 2016 but he finished the tournament with 2 points. At Chapter 47, Ringkampf (Walter, Axel Dieter Jr. and Timothy Thatcher) challenged British Strong Style (Pete Dunne, Trent Seven and Tyler Bate) for all of their championships, in a six-man tag team match, unsuccessfully challenging all of them. He defeated Matt Riddle to win the Progress Atlas Championship at Chapter 51: Screaming For Progress at the O2 Academy Birmingham. He lost the title to Riddle a little over a month later on a Progress card in New York City, but recaptured it at Chapter 55: Chase The Sun at Alexandra Palace in a three-way match that also involved Matt Riddle and Timothy Thatcher. At Chapter 68: Super Strong Style 16 Tournament Edition 2018, Walter vacated the Atlas title in order to chase the Progress world title, held by Travis Banks. At Chapter 74: Mid Week Matters, he defeated Banks to win the title.

During the 2019's edition of Super Strong Style 16, Walter defeated Trent Seven in a title vs title match, winning Seven's Progress Atlas Championship.
At Chapter 95: Still Chasing, Walter lost the Progress Unified  World Championship when Eddie Denis successfully cashed in his title opportunity gained by defeating Mark Andrews at Chapter 76. This was a triple threat match also involving David Starr.

Evolve (2017–2019)
Walter debuted in Evolve at Evolve 90 on 11 August 2017 in Joppa, Maryland, defending the Progress Atlas Championship against Fred Yehi.

Walter unsuccessfully challenged for the WWN Championship the next night at Evolve 91 in New York City in a four-way match that also involved Matt Riddle, Keith Lee, and Tracy Williams. He again made an unsuccessful challenge for the WWN Championship on 9 December 2017 when he was defeated by Lee at Evolve 96 in New York City.

Pro Wrestling Guerrilla (2017–2018)

Walter made his Pro Wrestling Guerrilla (PWG) debut by entering the 2017 Battle of Los Angeles tournament, where he was eliminated by eventual finalist Keith Lee in the opening round. He was then defeated by Ricochet at All Star Weekend 13 – Night One. The next day, he got his first PWG victory by defeating Zack Sabre Jr. in a match that was awarded a five-star rating by Dave Meltzer in the Wrestling Observer Newsletter.

In January 2018, Walter unsuccessfully challenged for the PWG World Tag Team Championship with Ringkampf partner Timothy Thatcher, losing to the defending Chosen Bros (Jeff Cobb and Matt Riddle). On 21 April 2018, Walter defeated champion Keith Lee and Jonah Rock in a three-way match to win the PWG World Championship. Walter later lost the title to Jeff Cobb on 19 October.

Defiant Wrestling (2018)
It was announced that Walter was going to be added to the Defiant Internet Championship match of David Starr against Travis Banks at Lights Out. However, Banks did not compete due to a foot injury. Instead, Walter would later defeat Starr to become the #1 Contender for Banks' title, which would end in a draw at No Regrets. On 2 June, Walter defeated Banks and Zack Sabre Jr. to win the Defiant Internet Championship. On 30 December 2018, Walter lost the title to Martin Kirby.

WWE

Longest-reigning NXT UK Champion (2019–2022)
On 12 January 2019 at NXT UK TakeOver: Blackpool, Walter made his WWE debut for the NXT UK brand by confronting WWE United Kingdom Champion Pete Dunne after Dunne's successful title defense. The following week, Walter confronted Dunne and Joe Coffey, making his intentions clear for Dunne's championship. On the 30 January 2019 episode of NXT UK, Walter made his WWE in-ring debut against Jack Starz. He beat Starz in under four minutes. At NXT TakeOver: New York, Walter defeated Dunne to win the WWE United Kingdom Championship, ending Dunne's record-setting reign at 685 days.

On the 22 May episode of NXT UK, Walter retained the United Kingdom Championship against Dunne in a rematch, after interference by the European Union (Fabian Aichner and Marcel Barthel), thus establishing himself as a heel and reuniting Ringkampf under the new name Imperium. The faction would later be joined by Alexander Wolfe, after he interfered in a match pitting Imperium against British Strong Style (the team of Dunne, Tyler Bate, and Trent Seven). On the 26 June episode of NXT UK, Walter retained his title against Travis Banks. On the 3 July episode, Imperium interfered in Moustache Mountain's title match against Grizzled Young Veterans, therefore making Grizzled Young Veterans retain their titles. After the match, they injured Tyler Bate. On 31 August at NXT UK TakeOver: Cardiff, Walter retained his title against Tyler Bate. The match was highly acclaimed and received five-and-a-quarter-star rating from Dave Meltzer.

In the build-up for the NXT UK and NXT co-branded event, Worlds Collide, Imperium began feuding with The Undisputed Era (NXT Champion Adam Cole, Roderick Strong, and NXT Tag Team Champions Bobby Fish and Kyle O'Reilly), which was further intensified during the closing moments of NXT UK TakeOver: Blackpool II on 12 January 2020, when the group attacked Imperium following Walter's successful title defense against Joe Coffey. During his reign the following week, the WWE United Kingdom Championship was renamed to NXT United Kingdom Championship and he was presented with a slightly updated belt design, which replaced the WWE logo at the center with the NXT UK logo. On the 29 October episode of NXT UK, Walter retained the championship in a match against Ilja Dragunov in another highly acclaimed match which received five stars from Dave Meltzer and becoming the third match in Walter's career to do so. On the 14 January episode, Walter would face A-Kid for his United Kingdom Title and retained. On 19 February 2021, Walter became the longest-reigning NXT United Kingdom Champion, breaking Pete Dunne's record of 685 days. On the 17 March episode of NXT, Walter would return to the NXT brand and decimated Tommaso Ciampa. It was then announced that at NXT TakeOver: Stand & Deliver Night 1, Walter would defend his NXT UK Title against Ciampa. On the 24 March episode of NXT, Walter defeated Drake Maverick. On April 5, his championship reign surpassed the two-year mark. Two days later at Stand & Deliver, Walter retained his title against Ciampa. The next day on NXT UK Prelude, Walter successfully defended his title against Rampage Brown. At NXT TakeOver 36, Walter dropped the title to Dragunov in a rematch, ending his historic reign at 870 days (this would be the longest reign in WWE history since 1988 until Roman Reigns surpassed this number with the WWE Universal Championship in January 2023). This match would receive five-and-a-quarter-star rating from Dave Meltzer, becoming the second Walter vs Dragunov match to do so and second match for Walter to break the five-star rating.

At the New Year's Evil special episode of NXT on 4 January 2022, Walter teamed up with Imperium stablemates Fabian Aichner and Marcel Barthel to face Riddle and MSK (Nash Carter and Wes Lee) in a six-man tag team match, which they lost. After having his final match on NXT UK on 13 January where he defeated Nathan Frazer, Walter was transferred to the NXT brand. On the 18 January episode of NXT, Walter defeated Roderick Strong in the main event, after which, he announced his new ring name as Gunther. In mid-March, Gunther started a brief feud with LA Knight when he took offense at the latter getting an NXT Championship match by calling out Dolph Ziggler. The next week, after Gunther defeated Duke Hudson, Knight challenged him to a match at NXT Stand & Deliver, which Gunther won. On the 5 April episode of NXT, he faced NXT Champion Bron Breakker in a losing effort, which turned out to be his final appearance for the brand.

Intercontinental Champion (2022–present)
On the 8 April episode of SmackDown, Gunther and Marcel Barthel (now known as Ludwig Kaiser) made their main roster debut. In his debut match, Gunther defeated Joe Alonzo in under 3 minutes. On the 27 May episode of SmackDown, Gunther and Kaiser made their debut as a tag team, defeating Drew Gulak and Intercontinental Champion Ricochet. On the 10 June episode of SmackDown, Gunther defeated Ricochet to win the Intercontinental Championship, making him the first Austrian to win the title. He would successfully defend the title against Ricochet in a rematch and Shinsuke Nakamura. Prior to Gunther's title defense at Clash at the Castle on 3 September, Ludwig Kaiser announced the reformation of Imperium by reintroducing Fabian Aichner, now known as Giovanni Vinci. Gunther subsequently defeated Sheamus to retain the title in a critically acclaimed match, with many deeming it the best match of the event. Dave Meltzer of the Wrestling Observer Newsletter rated the match five stars, marking Gunther's fifth match to receive five stars, and his first main roster match to receive this rating. He would beat Sheamus in a rematch on the 7 October episode of SmackDown.

On the 4 November episode of SmackDown, Gunther successfully defended the Intercontinental Championship against Rey Mysterio in the show's main event. He would follow this up with another successful title defense against Ricochet on the 16 December episode of SmackDown. On the 13 January 2023 episode of SmackDown, Gunther successfully defended the title against Braun Strowman. 

At the Royal Rumble on 28 January, Gunther was the first entrant and the last person eliminated from the titular match; he was eliminated by the match's winner Cody Rhodes, who entered as the thirtieth and final participant. His 71 minute and 25 second performance was the longest in the history of the event, excluding Daniel Bryan's 76-minute stint in the 50-man Greatest Royal Rumble. On 9 February, Gunther reached 245 days as champion, surpassing Shelton Benjamin's reign of 244 days, becoming the longest-reigning Intercontinental Champion in the 21st century. On 18 March, Gunther would reach 281 days as Intercontinental Champion, surpassing Greg Valentine's reign of 280 days, giving him the longest reign as intercontinental Champion in 34 years, putting him third behind Randy Savage and The Honky Tonk Man in the longest reigns of all-time.

Personal life
Hahn met English professional wrestler Jinny Sandhu during their time on the independent circuit. They married in 2022.

Championships and accomplishments
 CBS Sports
 Match of the Year (2020) vs. Ilja Dragunov
 Defiant Wrestling
 Defiant Internet Championship (1 time)
 ESPN
 Match of the year (2022) 
 European Wrestling Promotion
 EWP Tag Team Championship (1 time) – with Michael Kovac
 Fight Club: PRO
 Infinity Trophy (2018)
 German Stampede Wrestling
 GSW Tag Team Championship (1 time) – with Robert Dreissker
 Over the Top Wrestling
 OTT Championship (1 time)
 Progress Wrestling
 Progress Atlas Championship (3 times)
 Progress Unified World Championship (1 time)
 Pro Wrestling Fighters
 PWF Nordeuropäische Wrestling Meisterschaft Championship (1 time)
 Pro Wrestling Guerrilla
 PWG World Championship (1 time)
 Pro Wrestling Illustrated
 Ranked No. 14 of the top 500 singles wrestlers in the PWI 500 in 2019
 Rings of Europe
 20 man Halloween Rumble (2006)
RoE King of Europe No. 1 Contenders Championship Tournament (2007)
TNT Extreme Wrestling
 TNT World Championship (1 time)
 Westside Xtreme Wrestling
 wXw Unified World Wrestling Championship (3 times)
 wXw World Tag Team Championship (4 times) – with Robert Dreissker (1), Zack Sabre Jr (1), Timothy Thatcher (1) and Ilja Dragunov (1)
 wXw 16 Carat Gold Tournament (2010)
 wXw World Tag Team Tournament (2015) – with Zack Sabre Jr.
 World Tag Team League (2017) – with Timothy Thatcher
 Ambition 11 Tournament (2019)
 Wrestling Observer Newsletter
 Europe MVP (2018–2020)
 WWE
 WWE/NXT United Kingdom Championship (1 time)
 WWE Intercontinental Championship (1 time, current)

References

External links

 
 
 
 

1987 births
21st-century professional wrestlers
Austrian male professional wrestlers
Entertainers from Vienna
Living people
NXT United Kingdom Champions
Professional wrestling trainers
PWG World Champions
PROGRESS World Champions
Progress Wrestling Atlas Champions
WWF/WWE Intercontinental Champions